The electoral division of Rumney is one of the 15 electoral divisions in the Tasmanian Legislative Council (upper house). The division is located in Southern Tasmania to the east of the division of Pembroke.

The electorate is named after Mount Rumney in outer Hobart. The division covers an area of 434 km2 and includes a number of outer Hobart localities including; Lauderdale, Rokeby, Cambridge, Midway Point and Richmond.
The division is held by Labor member Sarah Lovell.

In January 2019, there was 24,680 people enrolled to vote in the division. The last election in Rumney was held on 6 May 2017. The next is scheduled for 2023.

Members

See also

 Tasmanian House of Assembly

References

Tasmanian parliament website
Tasmanian Electoral Office: Legislative Council
2005 Rumney Election Results

External links
Parliament of Tasmania
Tasmanian Electoral Commission - Legislative Council

Rumney
Southern Tasmania